Voortrekker High School may refer to:
 Voortrekker High School (Pietermaritzburg)
 Voortrekker High School (Cape Town)
 Hoërskool Voortrekker (Boksburg)
 Bethlehem Voortrekker High School